The 2016 Big 12 Conference women's basketball tournament was the postseason women's basketball tournament for the Big 12 Conference, held March 4–7 in Oklahoma City at Chesapeake Energy Arena. Baylor won their 8th Big 12 tournament title to earn an automatic trip to the NCAA women's tournament.

Seeds

Schedule

Bracket

All-Tournament team
Most Outstanding Player – Alexis Jones, Baylor

See also
2016 Big 12 Conference men's basketball tournament
2016 NCAA Women's Division I Basketball Tournament
2015–16 NCAA Division I women's basketball rankings

References

External links
 2016 Phillips 66 Big 12 Conference women's basketball tournament Official Website

Big 12 Conference women's basketball tournament
Tournament
Big 12 Conference women's basketball tournament
Big 12 Conference women's basketball tournament